Grégoire Aslan (born Krikor Kaloust Aslanian; 28 March 1908 – 8 January 1982) was a Swiss-Armenian actor and musician.

Early life
Krikor Kaloust Aslanian was born in Switzerland or in Constantinople, according to different sources. He made his professional début at 18 as a vocalist, trumpeter and drummer with the Paris dance band of Ray Ventura et ses Collegiens, then launched an acting career under the name of Coco Aslan. He also performed with guitarist Django Reinhardt.

Career
Aslan's first film appearance was uncredited in Marc Didier's 1935 Le Bille de mille. His first credited appearance was in Feux de joie (1939), along with conductor Ventura. During World War II he toured South America with actor Louis Jouvet and eventually started his own theatre troupe. He became an indispensable feature in many British and American films, usually playing foreigners – Russians, Frenchmen, Italians, Germans, Albanians and Middle Easterners – with equal finesse.

Aslan's screen appearances include gangster boss Duca in Joe MacBeth (1955), King of Kings (1961) as Herod, and Cleopatra (1963) as Pothinus. In 1961, in The Devil at 4 O'Clock, alongside Frank Sinatra and Spencer Tracy, he portrayed Marcel, a criminal who finds repentance by giving his life to save children from being killed by a volcanic eruption on a South Sea island. He played a police chief in Paris When It Sizzles (1964) and The Return of the Pink Panther (1975). He appeared in over 110 film and TV roles. He also appeared on the French stage in productions from 1946 to 1981.

Personal life 
From 1948 to 1955, Aslan was married to French theatre actress Denise Noël.

Death
Aslan died of a heart attack in Breage, whilst visiting Cornwall, England.

Selected filmography

  (1935)
 Adventure in Paris (1936) as Un membre de l'orchestre de Ray Ventura (uncredited)
 Feux de joie (1939) as Coco
 Whirlwind of Paris (1939) as Coco
 Radio Surprises (1940) as Robert
 La fruta mordida (1945)
  (1947) as Coco
 Sleeping Car to Trieste (1948) as Poirier, the chef
 Keep an Eye on Amelia (1949) as Le prince
 Wicked City (aka Hans le marin, 1949) as Le Brésilien
 A Man Walks in the City (1950) as Ambilarès
 Last Holiday (1950) as Gambini
 Cairo Road (1950) as Lombardi (as Coco)
 Cage of Gold (1950) as Duport
 The Adventurers (1951) as Dominic
  (1951) as Ernest Duranval
 The Red Inn (1951) as Barboeuf
 No Vacation for Mr. Mayor (1951) as M Beaudubec
 Jouons le jeu (1952) as l'acteur (segment 'La jalousie')
  (1952) as Coudert
 A Mother's Secret (1952) as Georges Lavier
 Innocents in Paris (1953) as Carpet Seller
 Good Lord Without Confession (1953) as Varesco
 Le Chevalier de la nuit (1953) as Le préfet de police
 This Man Is Dangerous (1953) as Siegella
 Act of Love (1953) as Commissaire (uncredited)
  (1954) as Mortimer Schoom
 La soupe à la grimace (1954) as Karl Worden
 Oasis (1955) as Pérez
 Mr. Arkadin (1955) as Bracco
 Joe MacBeth (1955) as Duncan
 Une fille épatante (1955) as Atcheminocc
  (1956) as Bodoni
  (1956) as Zajir
 He Who Must Die (1957) as Agha
 Les suspects (1957) as Inspecteur Ben Hamman
  (1957) as Le prince Yucca
 Casino de Paris (1957) as Mario
 A Bomb for a Dictator (1957) as Général Ribera
 Windom's Way (1957) as Mayor Lollivar
  (1957) as Mouillefarine
 The Snorkel (1958) as The Inspector
 Sea Fury (1958) as Fernando
 The Roots of Heaven (1958) as Habib
  (1959) as Stanley père
 Killers of Kilimanjaro (1959) as Ben Ahmed
 Our Man in Havana (1959) as Cifuentes
 Under Ten Flags (1960) as Master of Abdullah
 The Criminal (1960) as Frank Saffron
 The 3 Worlds of Gulliver (1960) as King Brob
 Bernadette de Lourdes (1961)
 The Rebel (1961) as Aristotle Carreras
 The Invasion Quartet (1961) as Debrie
 King of Kings (1961) as Herod the Great
 The Devil at 4 O'Clock (1961) as Marcel
 The Happy Thieves (1961) as Dr. Victor Muñoz
 Village of Daughters (1962) as Gastoni (A Father)
 (Marco Polo, unfinished French film, 1962) 
 Cleopatra (1963) as Pothinus
 The Main Chance (1964) as Potter
 Une ravissante idiote (1964) as Bagda
 Paris When It Sizzles (1964) as Police Insp. Gilet
  (1964) as Inspecteur Rossi
 Crooks in Cloisters (1964) as Lorenzo
 Amori pericolosi (1964) as Il generale (segment "Il generale")
 The Gorillas (1964) as Maître Lebavard
 The Yellow Rolls-Royce (1964) as the Albanian Ambassador
 The High Bright Sun (1965) as Gen. Stavros Skyros
 Marco the Magnificent (1965) as Achmed Abdullah
 Moment to Moment (1965) as Insp. DeFargo
 A Man Could Get Killed (1966) as Florian
 Our Man in Marrakesh (1966) as Achmed
 Lost Command (1966) as Dr. Ali Ben Saad
 The 25th Hour (1967) as Dobresco
 Tiffany Memorandum (1967) as The Shadow
 Marry Me! Marry Me! (1968) as Mr. Schmoll
 A Flea in Her Ear (1968) as Max, Hotel Coq Dor Owner
 The Thirteen Chairs (1969) as Psychiarist
 You Can't Win 'Em All (1970) as Osman Bey
 Le Cinéma de papa (1971) as Le producteur
 The Pebbles of Etratat (1972) as Timakoff
 Die rote Kapelle (1972, TV miniseries) as Baron Maximowitsch
 Sex-shop (1972) as Le père d'Isabelle / Father-in-law
 The Girl from Hong Kong (1973) as Harris
 The Golden Voyage of Sinbad (1973) as Hakim
 QB VII (1974, TV miniseries) as Sheik Hassan
 The Girl from Petrovka (1974) as Minister
 The Return of the Pink Panther (1975) as Lugash Police Chief
 Bloedverwanten (1977) as Rudolphe De Guys
 Gloria (1977) as Le patron du cabaret
 Meetings with Remarkable Men (1979) as Armenian Priest / Le prêtre arménien

References

External links
 

1908 births
1982 deaths
Armenian male actors
Swiss male film actors
Swiss male television actors
20th-century Swiss male actors
Swiss people of Armenian descent
Burials at Neuilly-sur-Seine community cemetery
Swiss male stage actors
Swiss expatriates in France
French people of Armenian descent